Chris & Julia's Sunday Night Takeaway (frequently referred to as Sunday Night Takeaway or simply Takeaway) is an Australian television variety show, presented by Chris Brown & Julia Morris. It is based on the British television show of a similar name, Ant & Dec's Saturday Night Takeaway, created and presented by Ant McPartlin and Declan Donnelly.

The following lists each series, a brief summary of segments, including changes to what was used, appearances by guests, ratings for each episode, scores from the "Chris vs. Julia" segment and information on guest announcers that appear.

Series overview

Series 1 (2019)

Ratings

I’m A Celebrity... Get out of my Ear!

Undercover Pranks

Audience Surprise

Little Chris & Julia

Singalong Live

Chris VS. Julia

Celebrity announcers

"End of the Show Show"

Takeaway Reheated (2020)
Ratings

References

Lists of Australian non-fiction television series episodes
Lists of non-fiction television series episodes